Sylvia Steiner (born 7 May 1982) is an Austrian sport shooter. Steiner competed in the 2020 Summer Olympics in Tokyo, in both the Women's 10m air pistol (finished 15th) and Women's 25m pistol (finished 29th) events.

References

1982 births
Living people
Shooters at the 2020 Summer Olympics
Austrian female sport shooters
Olympic shooters of Austria
21st-century Austrian women